Lescheroux is a commune in the Ain department in eastern France.

Geography
The Sâne Vive has its source in the commune; it crosses the village and forms part of the commune's northern border.

The Sâne Morte forms part of the commune's northeastern border.

The Reyssouze flows northwest through the southwestern part of the commune.

Population

See also
Communes of the Ain department

References

Communes of Ain
Ain communes articles needing translation from French Wikipedia
Bresse